The genus Cochleanthes is made up of 4 species of orchids native to Mexico, Central America, the West Indies and South America. The name Cochleanthes refers to the shape of the flower (in Greek, cochlos means "shell" and anthos means "flower").

Description
This genus as a rule lacks pseudobulbs and consequently produces tufted fan-like growths of fairly erect narrow leaves, and conforms to the sympodial method of growth. Plants of this genus produce single-flowered inflorescences, with the flowers often being quite large for the size of the plant, and occurring at any time of the year, though slightly more concentrated during summer in cultivation. All members of this genus have their flowers dominated by the large labellum (lip) which often has longitudinal markings upon it which serve as a nectar guide for pollinating insects. The flowers have four pollinia.

Cochleanthes is best kept under intermediate conditions with fairly high humidity, and should never be allowed to dry out. Plants are epiphytes and grow at elevations of up to 1500 metres in cloud forests.

List of species 

 Cochleanthes aromatica  (Rchb.f.) R.E.Schult. & Garay - Costa Rica, Panama
 Cochleanthes flabelliformis (Sw.) R.E.Schult. & Garay - Mexico, Central America, Cuba, Hispaniola, Jamaica, Puerto Rico, Trinidad, Venezuela, Colombia, Ecuador, Brazil
 Cochleanthes lueddemanniana  (Rchb.f.) R.E.Schult. & Garay - Colombia
 Cochleanthes trinitatis (Ames) R.E.Schult. & Garay - Trinidad

formerly included

 Cochleanthes amazonica = Warczewiczella amazonica 
 Cochleanthes candida = Warczewiczella candida 
 Cochleanthes discolor = Warczewiczella discolor 
 Cochleanthes guianensis = Warczewiczella guianensis 
 Cochleanthes ionoleuca = Warczewiczella ionoleuca 
 Cochleanthes lobata = Warczewiczella lobata 
 Cochleanthes marginata= Warczewiczella marginata 
 Cochleanthes palatina =  Warczewiczella palatina 
 Cochleanthes wailesiana = Warczewiczella wailesiana

References

 
Zygopetalinae genera
Epiphytic orchids
Taxa named by Constantine Samuel Rafinesque